is a  mountain in Nada, Kobe, Hyogo, Japan. This mountain is one of the major mountains of Rokko Mountains. Mount Nagamine literally means, long ridge mountain.

Outline 
Mount Nagamine is on a ridge, which branches off a main ridge of Rokko Mountains. Because the ridge stretches to the south, toward the Osaka-Kobe metropolitan area, climbers can enjoy attractive views from the top. On the top of the mountain, there is a rock called ‘Tenguzuka’. This mountain belongs to the Setonaikai National Park.

Route

This mountain has major two routes to the top. One is from Hankyu Rokko Station, and the other is from Ōji-kōen Station. It takes one and half hours from these stations to the top.

Access 
 Rokko Station of Hankyu Kobe Line
 Ōji-kōen Station of Hankyu Kobe Line

Gallery

References
 Official Home Page of the Geographical Survey Institute in Japan
 ‘Kansaishuhen no Yama 250’, Yama to Keikokusha Osakashikyoku

Mountains of Hyōgo Prefecture